In astronomy, the local standard of rest or LSR  follows the mean motion of material in the Milky Way in the neighborhood of the Sun (stars in radius 100 pc from the Sun). The path of this material is not precisely circular. The Sun follows the solar circle (eccentricity e < 0.1) at a speed of about 255 km/s in a clockwise direction when viewed from the galactic north pole at a radius of ≈ 8.34 kpc  about the center of the galaxy near Sgr A*, and has only a slight  motion, towards the solar apex, relative to the LSR.

The LSR velocity is  anywhere from 202–241 km/s.  In 2014, very-long-baseline interferometry observations of maser emission in high-mass star-forming regions (HMSFR) placed tight constraints on combinations of kinematic parameters such as the circular orbit speed of the Sun (Θ0 + V☉ = 255.2 ± 5.1 km/s).  There is significant correlation between the circular motion of the solar circle, the solar peculiar motion, and the predicted counterrotation of star-forming regions.  Additionally, local estimates of the velocity of the LSR based on stars in the vicinity of the Sun may potentially yield different results than global estimates derived from motions relative to the Galactic center.

See also

 Comoving coordinates for an example of another convenient astronomical reference frame.

References

External links
Ken Croswell: Milky Way keeps tight grip on its neighbour August 2008

Galactic astronomy